{{DISPLAYTITLE:C5H12O7P2}} 
The molecular formula C5H12O7P2 (molar mass: 246.09 g/mol, exact mass: 246.0058 u) may refer to:

 Dimethylallyl pyrophosphate (DMAPP)
 Isopentenyl pyrophosphate (IPP)